A list of all international Test Matches played by the Wallabies.

Legend

Overall

1890s

1900s

1910s

1920s

Notes:

1930s

1940s

1950s

1960s

1970s

1980s

1980

1981

1982

1983

1984

1985

1986

1987

1988

1989

1990s

1990

1991

1992

1993

1994

1995

1996

1997

1998

1999

2000s

2000

2001

2002

2003

2004

2005

2006

2007

2008

2009

2010s

2010

2011

2012

2013

2014

2015

2016

2017

2018

2019

2020s

2020

2021

2022

See also

 List of Australia national rugby union team records

References
 

 
Australia
Matches